The African Democratic Rally (Rassemblement Démocratique Africain) is a political party in Burkina Faso. It was originally known as the Voltaic Democratic Union-African Democratic Rally (UDV-RDA) and was formed in 1957 as the Voltaic section of the African Democratic Rally (RDA).

Soon after Independence in 1960, UDV-RDA became the only legal political party in Upper Volta and a civilian dictatorship was set up. In 1966, there was a military coup to overthrow the government, and the UDV-RDA didn't exist in the new government. Under the rule of Sangoulé Lamizana UDV-RDA was reconstructed and developed good relations with the government. The relation to Lamizana did however cause internal dissent. The pro-Lamizana faction was led by Prime Minister Joseph Conombo and the anti-Lamizana faction was led by Joseph Ouédrago.

At the time of the presidential and legislative elections 1978 UDV-RDA had one list for legislative but the different factions supported different presidential candidates. The party officially supported Lamizana's candidature. The dissidents, grouped as the 'Rejectors Front-RDA' (Front du Réfus-RDA) supported the candidature of Joseph Ouédrago. After the elections this faction split away and joined the Voltaic Progressive Front of Joseph Ki-Zerbo.

After the elections Lamizana joined the party. The party was also joined by the National Union of Independents (UNI) and the African Regroupment Party (PRA), which lost their status as political parties following the elections (the 1977 Constitution limited the number of political parties to three, and PRA and UNI were the parties that came 4th and 5th thus losing their legal status).

When Lamizana was overthrown in 1980, military rule was reinstituted, and the RDA never returned to power.

Nowadays it is part of the Alliance for Democracy and Federation-African Democratic Rally (Alliance pour la Démocratie et la Fédération-Rassemblement Démocratique Africain), the largest of the many opposition parties in Burkina Faso.

Electoral history

Presidential Elections

National Assembly elections

See also
History of Burkina Faso

1957 establishments in French Upper Volta
Pan-Africanism in Burkina Faso
Pan-Africanist political parties in Africa
Parties of one-party systems
Political parties established in 1957
Political parties in Burkina Faso
Sections of the Rassemblement Démocratique Africain